Jules Rattankoemar Ajodhia (27 January 1945 in Wanica District) is a Surinamese politician. He is a member of the Progressive Reform Party. From 1988 to 1990, he was Justice Minister. He was also twice vice president of Suriname. 

The first term as vice president was from 16 September 1991 to 15 September 1996. The second term started on 12 August 2000 and ended on 12 August 2005.

References

1945 births
Living people
People from Wanica District
Vice presidents of Suriname
Surinamese Hindus
Surinamese people of Indian descent
Members of the National Assembly (Suriname)
Progressive Reform Party (Suriname) politicians
Honorary Order of the Yellow Star
Justice ministers of Suriname